Bremer was a Legislative Assembly electorate in the state of Queensland.

History

Bremer was established as a single-member electorate by the Electoral Districts Act of 1872. However, in 1878, it was abolished and absorbed into the Electoral district of Ipswich, changing Ipswich from a single-member to two-member constituency.

Bremer was then resurrected under the 1910 Electoral Districts Act and continued until 1959 when it was again abolished and the major part of the electorate became the new Electoral district of Ipswich East.

Members

The following people were elected in Bremer:

Election results

See also
 Electoral districts of Queensland
 Members of the Queensland Legislative Assembly by year
 :Category:Members of the Queensland Legislative Assembly by name

References

Former electoral districts of Queensland